Costa Mesa (Spanish for "Table Coast") is a city in Orange County, California, United States. Since its incorporation in 1953, the city has grown from a semi-rural farming community of 16,840 to an urban area including part of the South Coast Plaza–John Wayne Airport edge city, one of the region's largest commercial clusters, with an economy based on retail, commerce, and light manufacturing. The city is home to the two tallest skyscrapers in Orange County. The population was 111,918 at the 2020 census.

History

Members of the Tongva and Acjachemen nations long inhabited the area. The Tongva villages of Lupukngna, at least 3,000 years old, and the shared Tongva and Acjachemen village of Genga, at least 9,500 years old, were located in the area on the bluffs along the Santa Ana River. 

After the 1769 expedition of Gaspar de Portolà, a Spanish expedition led by Junípero Serra named the area Vallejo de Santa Ana (Valley of Saint Anne). On November 1, 1776, Mission San Juan Capistrano became the area's first permanent European settlement in Alta California, New Spain.

In 1801, the Spanish Empire granted  to Jose Antonio Yorba, which he named Rancho San Antonio. Yorba's great rancho included the lands where the communities of Olive, Orange, Villa Park, Santa Ana, Tustin, Costa Mesa and Newport Beach stand today.

After the Mexican-American war, California became part of the United States, and American settlers arrived in this area and formed the town of Fairview in the 1880s near the modern intersection of Harbor Boulevard and Adams Avenue. However, a flood in 1889 wiped out the railroad serving the community, and it shriveled.

To the south, meanwhile, the community of Harper had arisen on a siding of the Santa Ana and Newport Railway, named after a local rancher. This town prospered on its agricultural goods. On May 11, 1920, Harper changed its name to Costa Mesa, which means "table coast" or "coast mesa" in Spanish. This is a reference to the city's geography as being a plateau by the coast. Fanny Bixby Spencer and her husband sponsored the contest which selected the city's new name.

Costa Mesa surged in population during and after World War II, as many thousands trained at Santa Ana Army Air Base and returned after the war with their families. Within three decades of incorporation, the city's population had nearly quintupled.

Geography

Climate
Costa Mesa has a semi-arid climate (Köppen climate classification BSh) with mild temperatures year round. Rain falls primarily in the winter months and is close to nonexistent during the summer. Morning low clouds and fog are common due to its coastal location.

Demographics

2010
At the 2010 census Costa Mesa had a population of 109,960. The racial makeup of Costa Mesa was 75,335 (68.5%) White (51.8% Non-Hispanic White), 1,640 (1.5%) African American, 686 (0.6%) Native American, 8,654 (7.9%) Asian, 527 (0.5%) Pacific Islander, 17,992 (16.4%) from other races, and 5,126 (4.7%) from two or more races. Hispanic or Latino of any race were 39,403 persons (35.8%).

The Census reported that 106,990 people (97.3% of the population) lived in households, 2,232 (2.0%) lived in non-institutionalized group quarters, and 738 (0.7%) were institutionalized.

There were 39,946 households, 12,298 (30.8%) had children under the age of 18 living in them, 16,478 (41.3%) were opposite-sex married couples living together, 4,369 (10.9%) had a female householder with no husband present, 2,392 (6.0%) had a male householder with no wife present.  There were 3,013 (7.5%) unmarried opposite-sex partnerships, and 281 (0.7%) same-sex married couples or partnerships. 10,963 households (27.4%) were one person and 2,775 (6.9%) had someone living alone who was 65 or older. The average household size was 2.68.  There were 23,239 families (58.2% of households); the average family size was 3.30.

The age distribution was 23,682 people (21.5%) under the age of 18, 12,847 people (11.7%) aged 18 to 24, 38,211 people (34.7%) aged 25 to 44, 25,106 people (22.8%) aged 45 to 64, and 10,114 people (9.2%) who were 65 or older.  The median age was 33.6 years. For every 100 females, there were 103.7 males.  For every 100 females age 18 and over, there were 102.7 males.

There were 42,120 housing units at an average density of 2,682.9 per square mile, of the occupied units 15,799 (39.6%) were owner-occupied and 24,147 (60.4%) were rented. The homeowner vacancy rate was 1.2%; the rental vacancy rate was 5.9%.  42,517 people (38.7% of the population) lived in owner-occupied housing units and 64,473 people (58.6%) lived in rental housing units.

During 2009–2013, Costa Mesa had a median household income of $65,830, with 15.1% of the population living below the poverty line.

2000
At the 2000 census there were 108,724 people in 39,206 households, including 22,778 families, in the city. The population density was 6,956.3 inhabitants per square mile (2,685.8/km). The racial makeup of the city was 69.48% White, 1.40% Black or African American, 0.78% Native American, 6.90% Asian, 0.60% Pacific Islander, 16.57% from other races, and 4.27% from two or more races.  31.75% of the population were Hispanic or Latino of any race.
Of the 39,206 households 29.2% had children under the age of 18 living with them, 42.8% were married couples living together, 10.3% had a female householder with no husband present, and 41.9% were non-families. 28.1% of households were one person and 6.3% were one person aged 65 or older. The average household size was 2.69 and the average family size was 3.34.

The age distribution was 23.2% under the age of 18, 11.2% from 18 to 24, 39.0% from 25 to 44, 18.1% from 45 to 64, and 8.4% 65 or older. The median age was 32 years. For every 100 females, there were 105.0 males. For every 100 females age 18 and over, there were 103.9 males.

The median household income was $50,732 and the median family income  was $55,456. Males had a median income of $38,670 versus $32,365 for females. The per capita income for the city was $23,342. About 8.2% of families and 12.6% of the population were below the poverty line, including 16.0% of those under age 18 and 6.2% of those age 65 or over.

Housing

Measure Y is a  ballot initiative approved by voters in 2016. It requires public approval of projects that have a general plan amendment or zoning change and would add 40 or more dwelling units or 10,000 or more square feet of commercial space. The median housing price is $807,000 ($505 per sq ft) and $3,500 for the median rent per month.

Economy
The city's economy relies heavily on retail and services. The largest center of commercial activity is South Coast Plaza, a shopping center noted for its architecture and size. The volume of sales generated by South Coast Plaza, on the strength of its more than 270 stores, places it among the highest volume regional shopping centers in the nation. South Coast Metro is a commercial, cultural, and residential district surrounding South Coast Plaza in northern Costa Mesa and southern Santa Ana, itself part of the South Coast Plaza–John Wayne Airport edge city.

Some manufacturing activity also takes place in the city, mostly in the industrial, southwestern quarter, which is home to a number of electronics, pharmaceuticals and plastics firms. Business services company Experian is the largest employer in the city, and has its North American headquarters in Costa Mesa.

Ceradyne, El Pollo Loco, Emulex, Hurley, RVCA, Toyota Racing Development, the Trinity Broadcasting Network, Vans, and Volcom are among the businesses headquartered in Costa Mesa. A local newspaper, the Daily Pilot, is published by the Los Angeles Times. 

Wahoo's Fish Taco was founded in Costa Mesa in 1988 by Chinese-Brazilian brothers Eduardo "Ed" Lee, Renato "Mingo" Lee and Wing Lam.

Costa Mesa offers 26 parks, a municipal golf course, 26 public schools and two libraries.

Top employers
According to the city's 2020 Comprehensive Annual Financial Report, the top employers in the city are:

Arts and culture

Annual cultural events

The Orange County Fair takes place at the fairgrounds in Costa Mesa each July. The Fair receives more than one million visitors each year.

The Annual Scarecrow & Pumpkin Festival was first held in 1938, went on hiatus for seven decades, and then was restarted in 2013.

Facilities
Adjacent to the Fairgrounds is the Pacific Amphitheatre, which has hosted acts such as Madonna, Jessica Simpson, Steppenwolf, and Kelly Clarkson.

The Segerstrom Center for the Arts and South Coast Repertory Theater are based in the city.

Los Angeles Chargers
Costa Mesa has been home to the NFL's Los Angeles Chargers training center, training camp and cooperate headquarters since 2017. The team agreed to a lease with the facility they moved into prior to their relocation from San Diego.

The building is a former office space, but Chargers players and coaches said it was an upgrade from what the team had in San Diego. The team has a 10-year lease on the building and plans to stay there until 2024 when it will depart it for a purpose built practice facility in El Segundo. The team gutted the first floor of the building to make room for team rooms. Construction cost more than $3.8 million. Decades prior, the facility was a lima bean farm owned by a Swedish immigrant family who became prominent developers in Orange County.

Government

Local
A general law city, Costa Mesa has a council-manager form of government. In November 2016, voters approved changing the City Council seats from at-large to six voting districts and a directly elected mayor, who acts as the chairperson for the council and head of the government. Day to day, the city is run by a professional city manager and staff of approximately 460 full-time employees.

Management of the city and coordination of city services are provided by:

Needle exchange programs are prohibited in Costa Mesa.

State and federal

Politics
According to the California Secretary of State, as of February 10, 2019, Costa Mesa has 55,849 registered voters. Of those, 17,920 (32.1%) are registered Democrats, 17,900 (32.1%) are registered Republicans, and 17,019 (30.5%) have declined to state a political party/are independents.

Until 2008, Costa Mesa was a Republican stronghold in presidential elections. Since 2008, Costa Mesa has mostly voted Democratic in presidential elections, owing to the GOP's shift towards cultural conservatism. In 2008, Barack Obama was the first Democrat to carry Costa Mesa in decades, while Republican nominee Mitt Romney carried the city by only 364 votes in the 2012 presidential election. Costa Mesa flipped back to Democratic in 2016, voting for Hillary Clinton by a 10.2% margin, and for Joe Biden by a 14.6% margin in 2020. 

In 2008, Costa Mesa was one of four cities in Orange County to vote against Proposition 8 (along with Aliso Viejo, Irvine, and Laguna Beach), a statewide ballot measure that banned same-sex marriages.

Education
Institutions of higher learning located in Costa Mesa include Orange Coast College, and Vanguard University (affiliated with the Assemblies of God. Whittier Law School was a former school.

Costa Mesa has two public high schools, Costa Mesa High School and Estancia High School. There are also two public middle schools; Tewinkle Middle School, which was named after Costa Mesa's first mayor, and Costa Mesa Middle School which shares the same campus as Costa Mesa High School. Costa Mesa also has two alternative high schools that share the same campus, Back Bay High School and Monte Vista High School and another, Coastline Early College High School which is on its own facility. These are located in the Newport-Mesa Unified School District.

Infrastructure

Transportation

Costa Mesa is served by several bus lines of the Orange County Transportation Authority (OCTA), but most transportation is by automobile. Two freeways terminate here, State Route 73 and State Route 55 (also known as the Costa Mesa Freeway). The San Diego Freeway, Interstate 405, also runs through the city.

Civic Center
The 9.5 acre (38,000 m2) Costa Mesa Civic Center is located at 77 Fair Drive. City hall is a five-story building where the primary administrative functions of the city are conducted. Also contained in the Civic Center complex are Council Chambers, the Police facility, Communications building and Fire Station No. 5.

Emergency services
Fire protection is provided by the Costa Mesa Fire Department.  Law enforcement is the responsibility of the Costa Mesa Police Department.  Emergency Medical Services are provided by the Costa Mesa Fire Department and Care Ambulance Service.

Notable people
 See List of people from Costa Mesa, California

Sister city
 Wyndham, Australia

See also
 Los Angeles Times suburban sections
 Otherside Farms

References

External links

 
 
 City of Costa Mesa Chamber of Commerce
 City of Costa Mesa official Conference & Visitor Bureau

 
Cities in Orange County, California
Incorporated cities and towns in California
Populated places on the Santa Ana River
1953 establishments in California
Populated places established in 1953